Georgia competed in the Summer Olympic Games as an independent nation for the first time at the 1996 Summer Olympics in Atlanta, United States.  Previously, Georgian athletes competed for the Unified Team at the 1992 Summer Olympics. 34 competitors, 27 men and 7 women, took part in 39 events in 13 sports.

Medalists

Archery

In its debut Olympic archery competition, Georgia sent only Unified Team-era veteran archer and quarterfinalist Khatouna Kurivichvili.  In Atlanta, she was defeated in the first round.

Athletics

Women's track

Women's field

Boxing

Diving

Fencing

One male fencer represented Georgia in 1996.

Gymnastics

Artistic

Rhythmic

Judo

Men

Modern pentathlon

Sailing

Open
Fleet racing

Shooting

Weightlifting

Men

Wrestling

Freestyle

Notes

References

Nations at the 1996 Summer Olympics
1996
Summer